was a district located in Ōmi Province/Shiga Prefecture.

The district is equivalent to the former towns of Nishiazai, Kohoku, Torahime, Biwa, Azai (excluding Sumainiwa), and northern Ibuki.

Timeline
1878 Splits into Nishiazai and Higashiazai Districts.

See also
List of dissolved districts of Japan

External links 

Ōmi Province
Former districts of Shiga Prefecture